John Gilbert Brogden  (born 28 March 1969) is an Australian and international mental health and suicide prevention advocate, suicide survivor, businessman and former NSW politician.  Brogden is the President of LifeLine International, Patron and former Chairman of Lifeline Australia, Chair of AusPayNet, Director of Colonial First State Superannuation, Chair of the Urban Property Group Advisory Board and Chairman of Furlough House Retirement Village.

He was Leader of the Opposition in New South Wales from 2002 to 2005. He was a Liberal Party Member for Pittwater in the  Legislative Assembly of NSW, Australia, from May 1996 until his resignation in August 2005. After politics, he served as the Chair and CEO of various organisations in the financial services and property sectors. 

On Australia Day 2014 he was made a Member of the Order of Australia for significant service to the community, particularly to Lifeline, to the business and financial sectors, and to the Parliament of New South Wales.

Early life and family
Brogden was born in Balmain and raised in Sydney. His father Gilbert Arthur Brogden, a carpenter, was born in Taranaki, New Zealand in 1933 and emigrated to Australia in 1960. His mother, Judith Anne (née Bourne) (1941 – 2021) was born in Balmain and worked as a School Secretary. He was educated at St Joan of Arc, Haberfield, St Patrick's College, Strathfield and the University of Sydney where he gained a Master of Public Affairs (MPA).

His wife Lucy Brogden AM is an organisational psychologist and national mental health and suicide prevention advocate, a carer, a Patron of Partners in Depression, Patron of the Sydney Women's Fund and Lifeline Northern Beaches, Chair of the Diabetes Australia Research Trust, a, Director of the National Film and Sound Archives and of Be Kind Australia. She is Governor of Queenwood School for Girls. From 2017 To 2022 she was the Chair of the National Mental Health Commission advising the Prime Minster and Minister for Health on mental health policy. They have three children.

Political career
John Brogden joined the Liberal Party in his final year of high school in 1986. Between 1989 and 1994 he was an adviser to Attorney General John Hannaford, Premier John Fahey and Police Minister Ted Pickering. From 1992 to 1993 he was President of the NSW Division of the Young Liberal Movement, and a member of the NSW Division's State Executive. In 1994, he served a year as Treasurer of the Movement and ran unsuccessfully for preselection in the state seat of Vaucluse. He rejoined the State Executive in 1995 elected as a Metropolitan Representative. 

From 1994 to 1995 Brogden was a consultant at public affairs company Cosway Australia. From 1995 to 1996 he was a Senior Adviser at the Credit Union Services Corporation (CUSCAL). 

Brogden was elected to the NSW Legislative Assembly as the Member for Pittwater in May 1996 in a by election following the resignation of former Fahey Government Minister Jim Longley. In 1999 he was promoted to the Shadow Ministry as the Shadow Minister for Urban Affairs and Planning, Sydney Water and Youth Affairs.

In the leadup to the 2003 election, Opposition Leader Kerry Chikarovski was struggling in the polls against Premier Bob Carr. On 25 March 2002, Brogden announced a challenge. Three days later on 28 March 2002, his 33rd birthday, he succeeded in a 15–14 vote, becoming the youngest ever leader of a state or federal Liberal Party.

At the 2003 election the Liberals won one seat from Labor and lost one to Labor. Notwithstanding the electoral defeat, Brogden improved his and the party's standing in the polls over the next two years. For part of 2005 the Coalition was in front of Labor , with many people believing that Brogden would win the 2007 election, especially when Bob Carr resigned from politics and Morris Iemma was elected as the new Premier.

Brogden confronted the government over a number of issues, often focussing on health and police corruption. He aggressively pursued the Carr government over its involvement in the Orange Grove affair, in which a shopping centre was shut down, allegedly for zoning reasons, amidst claims of political pressure from The Westfield Group, which ran a neighbouring shopping centre. Brogden also pursued scandals relating to patient care at Camden and Campbelltown Hospitals.

Despite the improvement in the opposition's opinion-poll ratings during 2004 and early 2005, Brogden's hopes that he would gain the premiership in 2007 were not to be fulfilled. He became embroiled in controversy for his behaviour at a function in Sydney on 29 July 2005.

As a result of the controversy, Brogden resigned as Leader of the NSW Opposition on 29 August. Nevertheless, he announced his intention to remain as the Member for Pittwater.

The next day however, 30 August, police attended Brogden's electorate office at around 10.30 pm, after concerns were raised by members of his family. They found him unconscious in a back room, having attempted suicide. When the Sydney Morning Herald called Brogden's deputy Barry O'Farrell at about 11 pm to question him about possible leadership contention, he told them, "Excuse me if I say I don't care about the leadership at the moment, but I am following an ambulance with John Brogden inside. He has attempted self-harm. It sort of puts things in perspective, doesn't it?". Brogden was taken to Royal North Shore Hospital that night, and discharged the following day into respite care at the Northside Clinic. On 1 September, Brogden and his wife issued a short statement thanking people who had sent messages of support, and inviting people wishing to help further to donate to beyondblue, an organisation dedicated to supporting people with depression, anxiety and suicide related experiences.

Brogden resigned from parliament on 28 September. A by-election was held for the seat of Pittwater, which, in a backlash to the Liberal Party and media treatment of Brogden, was won by Pittwater Council mayor Alex McTaggart, running as an independent. At the 2007 state election McTaggart was defeated by Liberal candidate Rob Stokes, a former adviser to Brogden.

Business career

Brogden is currently the President of LifeLine International. In May 2018, Brogden was appointed as Chief Executive Officer at Landcom. Prior to this appointment, he was Chairman of the Board at UrbanGrowth NSW/Landcom from 2012 to 2018. Prior to this he was the Managing Director & CEO of the Australian Institute of Company Directors from 2015 to 2017, the CEO of the Financial Services Council  from 2009 to 2015 and the CEO of Manchester Unity from 2006 to 2008.

He also holds also holds honorary positions as the Patron of Kookaburra Kids, Sailability Pittwater, Bilgola Surf Lifesaving Club and Avalon Beach Surf Lifesaving Club.

Brogden's previous non-executive directorships include Abacus Australian Mutuals (Chairman) from 2006 to 2009, BBI – The Australian Institute of Theological Education (Chairman), NIA Pty Limited (health.com.au) from 2011 to 2015, Sydney Ports Corporation from 2010 to 2012, Australian Private Health Insurance Association and the Australian Friendly Societies Association.

References

1969 births
Living people
 Australian people of New Zealand descent
Australian chief executives
Liberal Party of Australia members of the Parliament of New South Wales
Members of the New South Wales Legislative Assembly
Leaders of the Opposition in New South Wales
Members of the Order of Australia
People educated at St Patrick's College, Strathfield
21st-century Australian politicians